The Warren County Regiment was established on January 3, 1779 by the North Carolina General Assembly when Bute County and its Regiment of militia were abolished.  The regiment was engaged in battles and skirmished in North Carolina, South Carolina, and Georgia.

Leadership
Colonels:
 Colonel Thomas Eaton, commander (1779-1783), former commander of the Bute County Regiment (1776-1779)
 Colonel Herbert Haynes, second colonel (1779-1783)

Lieutenant Colonels:
 Lt. Col. Alexander Dick
 Lt. Col. Philemon Hawkins, Jr.
 Lt. Col. William Christmas
 Lt. Col. Joseph Hawkins

Known engagements
The regiment was known to be involved in 11 battles, skirmishes and sieges:
 March 3, 1779, Battle of Briar/Brier Creek, Georgia
 June 20, 1779, Battle of Stono Ferry, South Carolina
 August 11, 1780, Battle of Little Lynches Creek, South Carolina
 August 16, 1780, Battle of Camden, South Carolina
 September 26, 1780, Battle of Charlotte. North Carolina
 December 4, 1780, Battle of Rugeley's Mills #2, South Carolina
 January 17, 1781, Battle of Cowpens, South Carolina
 March 15, 1781, Battle of Guilford Court House, North Carolina
 April 25, 1781, Battle of Hobkirk's Hill, South Carolina
 May 12, 1781, Battle of Fort Motte, South Carolina
 May 24 to June 1, 1781, Siege of Augusta, Georgia

See also
 Bute County, North Carolina
 Warren County, North Carolina
 Franklin County, North Carolina
 Bute County Regiment
 Southern Campaigns: Pension Transactions for a description of the transcription effort by Will Graves
 Southern theater of the American Revolutionary War
 List of North Carolina militia units in the American Revolution

References

North Carolina militia
Warren County, North Carolina
1779 establishments in North Carolina